Dith Tina (born 7 January 1979) is a Cambodian politician and engineer who currently serves as Minister of Agriculture, Forestry and Fisheries. He was the secretary of state for the Ministry of Mines and Energy from 2014 to 2022. He is the son of chief justice Dith Munty.

References

1979 births
People from Phnom Penh 
Living people
21st-century Cambodian politicians
Agriculture ministers 
Cambodian People's Party politicians
Government ministers of Cambodia